Lisa Schurer Lambert is a management professor. She is the William S. Spears Chair of Business at Oklahoma State University–Stillwater, which is the flagship campus of the Oklahoma State University System. Her focus is management, business and she has authored papers specializing in employment relationship, leadership, psychological contracts, and person-environment fit theory. In 2022 Lambert was named co-editor of the journal Organizational Research Methods.

Career 
Lambert graduated from Northwestern University in 1981 with a B.S., and received an M.M. from the same institution in 1988. She earned her Ph.D. from the University of North Carolina at Chapel Hill in 2004. Following her Ph.D. she was a professor at Georgia State University from 2004 until 2018. In 2018 she moved to Oklahoma State University, and she was named the William S. Spears Chair of Business in 2021.

From 2016 to 2021, she was Associate Editor of Organizational Research Methods. Starting January 2022 Lambert was named the co-editor of the journal Organizational Research Methods which makes, and her co-editor Tine Köhler, the first female scholars to lead the journal, which is published on behalf of the Academy of Management.

From 2018 to 2023, she was president of the Southern Management Association, and she has been a fellow of the organization since 2016.

Lambert is known for her work on employee relations, with her research addressing how employees interact with their bosses and leadership styles of CEOs.

Works

Awards and honors 
In 2013 Lambert received the Robert McDonald Advancement of Organizational Research Methodology Award for her 2007 paper published with Jeffrey Edwards.

References

External links 
 

Living people
Northwestern University alumni
University of North Carolina at Chapel Hill alumni
Oklahoma State University faculty
Management education
Year of birth missing (living people)